Medici is a historical drama television series created by Frank Spotnitz and Nicholas Meyer. The series was produced by Italian companies Lux Vide and Rai Fiction, in collaboration with Frank Spotnitz's Big Light Productions.

The series premiered in Italy on Rai 1 on 18 October 2016. The series follows the Medici family, bankers of the Pope, during Renaissance Florence. Each season follows the events of a particular moment of the family history exploring the political and artistic landscape of Renaissance Italy.

The first season, titled Medici: Masters of Florence, takes place in 1429, the year Giovanni de' Medici, head of the family, died. His son Cosimo de' Medici succeeds him as head of the family bank, the richest bank of Europe at that time, and fights to preserve his power in Florence. The second season, titled Medici: The Magnificent, takes place 35 years later and tells the story of Cosimo's grandson Lorenzo de' Medici (known as the Magnificent). A third season, which completes the story of Lorenzo, premiered on Rai 1 in Italy on 2 December 2019.

The series reached between four and eight million viewers on original airings. According to Italian ratings compiler Auditel, the broadcast of the first episode attracted a record 8.04 million viewers.

The series is broadcast in 190 countries worldwide, including on Netflix in the United States, Canada, the UK, Ireland and India, and on SBS in Australia.

Plot

Season 1 
Florence, 1429. Giovanni de' Medici is a rich banker who also represents one of the most important political forces of Florence's Signoria. He has a plan to increase his family's power by making an agreement with the Church of Rome. The election of a new Pope is about to take place and Giovanni sends his sons Cosimo and Lorenzo to Rome in order to encourage the election of a Pope close to his family. In Rome, Cosimo, fascinated by the beauty of ancient architecture and art, meets Donatello and one of his models Bianca. Cosimo falls in love with her but is then forced to leave her and marry Contessina de Bardi, a political marriage arranged by Giovanni and Contessina's father. The Medici's candidate gets elected, which assures the bank of the Medici of an unparalleled economic power. Twenty years later, Giovanni is mysteriously murdered and Cosimo and Lorenzo try secretly to investigate his death. Meanwhile, the political situation in the city is troubled by plots against the Medici family's power, and their vision of the future of Florence - which will then lead to the Renaissance - is in danger. Cosimo's dream is to complete the Duomo of Florence, but no architect seems to have a feasible solution due to the shape of the base created for the cathedral. Finally, Filippo Brunelleschi introduces himself to Cosimo and shows him plans for the dome. Cosimo decides to trust Brunelleschi and the construction of the cathedral starts, bringing jobs and people to Florence. Meanwhile, the mystery surrounding the death of Giovanni thickens and Rinaldo Albizzi, Cosimo's main opponent in the Signoria, tries to block the construction and to incite the people to rise up against the Medicis.

Season 2 
Twenty years have passed since the events of the first season. Piero, Cosimo's son, and his wife Lucrezia are now at the head of the family. The power of the Medici has consolidated over time, but an assassination attempt on Piero brings to light his mismanagement of the family bank. The Sforza family are the largest debtors of the bank, but come to an agreement with Piero to erase it. The solution proposed by Sforza would also bring about the invasion of Florence. To prevent this, Piero's son Lorenzo takes over the role of his father both in the government of the Signoria and as head of the family. Although he has a relationship with a married woman, Lucrezia Donati, Lorenzo accepts marriage to a religious Roman noblewoman, Clarice Orsini (who initially wanted to be a nun but is obliged to give up her dream for the marriage). Their marriage goes through a turbulent time as their interests differ, but he soon falls in love with her and they start living happily. His brother Giuliano and his dear friend Sandro Botticelli, both meet and fall in love with Simonetta, although in different ways. Botticelli's interest is an artistic one and leads to the painting of Venus and Mars in which Simonetta is represented alongside Giuliano.
The Pazzi family, led by Jacopo Pazzi and his nephew Francesco, join forces with the Pope to increase the Church's control of nearby territories and mines, in opposition to the Medici's policy. This argument will eventually lead to a conspiracy against Lorenzo in an attempt to put an end to his power and his dream of a peaceful and culturally alive Florence.

Season 3
This season starts immediately after the previous one. With his brother's death, Lorenzo has grown into a cruel determined man and vows revenge. He soon has three children with Clarice and a miscarried child as well that leads to Clarice's death, and they also raise Giulio (Giuliano's illegitimate son) after his father's death. Following the breakdown of the Pazzi conspiracy, Lorenzo must still face a military coalition from the Papal States and the Kingdom of Naples, led by the ambitious Girolamo Riario. He undertakes a diplomatic journey to Naples and succeeds in negotiating a separate peace.
Season 3 focuses on how Lorenzo would do anything, to any extent for his family and his legacy.

Episodes

Cast

Season 1: Masters of Florence 

Richard Madden as Cosimo de' Medici: Head of the Medici family after his father's death
Stuart Martin as Lorenzo de' Medici: Cosimo's younger brother
Annabel Scholey as Contessina de' Bardi: Cosimo's wife. Scholey also appears in season 2 as an older Contessina in flashback scenes.
Guido Caprino as Marco Bello: Cosimo's loyal friend and ally, also appears in season 2 in flashback scenes.
Alessandro Sperduti as Piero de' Medici: Cosimo's son
Ken Bones as Ugo Bencini: Administrator of the Medici Bank
Lex Shrapnel as Rinaldo degli Albizzi: Cosimo's enemy
Daniel Caltagirone as Andrea Pazzi: A powerful member of the Signoria
Valentina Bellè (dub. : Aisling Franciosi) as Lucrezia Tornabuoni: Piero's wife
Alessandro Preziosi (dub. : Jeremy Nicholas) as Filippo Brunelleschi
Eugenio Franceschini (dub. : Alex Wells-King) as Ormanno Albizzi: Rinaldo and Alessandra's son
Sarah Felberbaum as Maddalena: Cosimo's lover in Venice and Florence
Miriam Leone as Bianca: Cosimo's lover in Rome
Michael Schermi (dub. : Callum Cameron) as Ricciardo: A common man of Florence, loyal to Cosimo
Tatjana Inez Nardone as Emilia: Contessina's maid
Valentina Cervi as Alessandra Albizzi: Rinaldo's wife
Brian Cox as Bernardo Guadagni: Officer of the Signoria
Dustin Hoffman as Giovanni di Bicci de' Medici: Cosimo and Lorenzo's father
David Bradley as Count Bardi: Contessina's father
David Bamber as Pope Eugenius IV

Seasons 2–3: The Magnificent 

Daniel Sharman as Lorenzo the Magnificent
Sam Taylor Buck as young Lorenzo (recurring season 2)
Bradley James as Giuliano de' Medici (season 2; recurring season 3): Lorenzo's younger brother
Sarah Parish as Lucrezia Tornabuoni: Lorenzo's mother 
Synnøve Karlsen as Clarice Orsini or Clarice de' Medici: Lorenzo's wife
Alessandra Mastronardi as Lucrezia Donati: Lorenzo's lover (season 2), ex lover (season 3)
Julian Sands as Piero de' Medici (recurring season 2): Lorenzo's father
Matteo Martari (dub. : Jack Hickey) as Francesco de' Pazzi (season 2): Jacopo's nephew
Niccolo Alaimo as young Francesco (recurring season 2)
Aurora Ruffino (dub. : Peta Cornish) as Bianca de' Medici (season 2; recurring season 3): Lorenzo's sister
Matilda Lutz as Simonetta Vespucci (season 2): Giuliano's lover
Filippo Nigro as Luca Soderini (season 2): Lorenzo's ally
Annabel Scholey as Contessina de' Bardi (season 2)
Sean Bean as Jacopo de' Pazzi (season 2)
Raoul Bova (season 2) and John Lynch (recurring season 3) as Pope Sixtus IV
Louis Partridge as Piero de' Medici (season 3): Lorenzo and Clarice's eldest son 
Hughie Hamer as young Piero (season 3)
Andrei Claude as Federico da Montefeltro (season 2)
 William Franklyn-Miller as Giovanni de' Medici (season 3): Lorenzo and Clarice's second son
Nico Delpiano as young Giovanni (season 3)
 Jacob Dudman as Giulio de' Medici (season 3): Giuliano and Fioretta's illegitimate son, Lorenzo and Clarice's adoptive son
Zukki DeAbaitua as young Giulio (recurring season 3)
Grace May O’Leary as Maddalena de' Medici (season 3): Lorenzo and Clarice's only daughter
Francesco Montanari (dub. : Peter Gaynor) as Girolamo Savonarola (season 3)
Johnny Harris as Bruno Bernardi (season 3)
Sebastian de Souza as Sandro Botticelli (season 3, recurring season 2): Lorenzo's friend and painter
Callum Blake as Carlo de' Medici (season 3, recurring season 2): Lorenzo's uncle who lives in Rome
Jack Roth as Girolamo Riario (season 3): the nephew of Pope Sixtus IV
Marius Bizau as younger Girolamo Riario (recurring season 2)
Toby Regbo as Tommaso Peruzzi (season 3)
Rose Williams as Caterina Sforza Riario (season 3): Girolamo Riario's wife
Chiara Baschetti as Fioretta Gorini (season 3): Giuliano's ex-mistress and Giulio's late mother

Appearances

Production
Sergio Mimica-Gezzan directed all eight episodes in the first season. The show's world premiere took place in Florence at Palazzo Vecchio on the 14 October 2016, ahead of its premiere airing on RAI 1 on October 18.

Filming for the second season started in Rome on 24 August 2017.

On 28 August 2018 filming for the third season started in Formello, outside Rome.

Historical accuracy
During an interview at the Roma Fest panel in 2015, Spotnitz stated, "the season will be more thriller than historical saga... we begin the show with a 'what if' because we don't know how Giovanni de' Medici died. One of the questions that haunts Cosimo, is whether his father was murdered".

Locations
Several noticeable locations are used throughout the series, in addition to sets and sound stages:

 Bracciano Castle: The principal courtyards and staircases of the Orsini-Odescalchi castle in Bracciano serve as streets in Florence, a palace in Rome, and the ancestral home of Contessina de' Bardi. The central courtyard in the Castle features a particularly recognisable staircase with the sculpture of a bear; this staircase becomes the principal entrance of the Medici home in Florence with the addition of the Medici Coat of Arms.
 The Villa Farnese in Caprarola and its gardens: The frescoed and ring-vaulted internal terrace-courtyard of Villa Caprarola doubles as a Medici villa in the series, while an un-frescoed terrace is used as a Vatican property in Rome. The Caprarola secret gardens with their unique fountains are used to represent the Vatican Gardens.
The creators took significant liberties with sets, often showing interior decorations, works of art, and exterior landscapes that were created many years after the events described in the series which occur in the mid-1430s. For example, the Medici Palazzo was built in 1440s–1480s and the Benozzo Gozzoli frescoes of Magi Chapel shown in the Cosimo study were executed in 1459–61. The Lorenzo rooms are decorated with the Giulio Romano fresco "Mars and Venus" which was painted in the 1520s in Palazzo Te in Mantova. During the episode exile in Venice, the church of Santa Maria della Salute built in the 1630s is repeatedly shown as part of the Venice city landscape. Villa Medici contains "Fortitude and Temperance with Six Antique Heroes" by Perugino, painted in 1497.
 Castle of Santa Severa is Cardinal Baldassarre Cossa's Palace.
 The medieval oldtown of Viterbo and its Palazzo dei Papi are the set for late medieval Rome.
 Hadrian's Villa in Tivoli is another set for Rome; Cosimo meets Donatello along the Canopus.
 Borgo di Rota, a frazione of Tolfa, is the set for Francesco Sforza's army camp and the village where Lorenzo meets mercenary Ferzetti (played by Alessandro Cremona).
 Pienza: used as the Palazzo Medici, the streets of Florence, and the background for Cosimo's wedding.
 Montepulciano: Several scenes are filmed outside the Duomo using the unfinished façade of the cathedral as a backdrop.  These scenes often incorrectly show the Duomo of Florence rising in the background to the north.  The Communal Palace, also in Piazza Grande, is part of several scenes, as is the Church of San Biagio.

Technical details
Medici: Masters of Florence was originated in 4k video and broadcast in this format on the free Italian satellite service Tivu whilst on the Italian Digital Terrestrial service DVB-T2 it was broadcast in Full-HD 1920×1080.

Two audio tracks were broadcast: Rai TV gave satellite and terrestrial viewers the option to watch the series in Italian or English.

International transmission 

Netflix carries out the show in the US, Canada, the UK, Ireland and India since December 2016. They lost the rights to season 1 in January 2023.

The series is broadcast in 190 countries worldwide, including on SBS in Australia, on Fox Premium in Argentina, SFR's premium SVOD service Zive in France, Sky 1 in Germany, on RTP1 in Portugal, and on RTS2 in Serbia. It was also sold in Japan, Israel, and New Zealand.

Home media 

The second season was also released in Blu-Ray (Region B) on the 24 January 2019. Both Italian editions have the original audio track in English and the Italian-dubbed audio track.

Other media 
On the 16 October 2018, a novelisation of the events told in the second season titled I Medici - Lorenzo il Magnifico was published in Italy by Michele Gazo.

Soundtrack
The soundtrack for the series was composed by Paolo Buonvino. The opening theme song Renaissance was produced with the collaboration of Skin. A video clip for the song was also published the day before the series premiered in Italy.

The opening theme song for the second season changed. Skin and Buonvino collaborated on a variation of the original opening sequence song titled Revolution Bones. Ian Arber composed additional music for the second season.

On December 20, 2019 the full soundtrack I Medici (Music from the Original TV Series) was released by Sugar Music with a total of 47 tracks composed by Paolo Buonvino.

Track listing

Reception

Awards

References

External links

Trailer on YouTube (English with French Subtitles). Posted 8 October 2016.
Medici: Masters of Florence Dedicated Website

House of Medici
2016 Italian television series debuts
2016 British television series debuts
2010s Italian television series
2010s British drama television series
British historical television series
Historical television series
Television series about the history of Italy
Television series set in the 15th century
Cultural depictions of Lorenzo de' Medici
Television shows set in Florence
Cultural depictions of Niccolò Machiavelli
Cultural depictions of Girolamo Savonarola
Cultural depictions of Caterina Sforza
Depictions of Leonardo da Vinci on television
Cultural depictions of Michelangelo
Sandro Botticelli
RAI original programming